The 2011 Alabama Crimson Tide softball team is an American softball team, representing the University of Alabama for the 2011 NCAA softball season. The Crimson Tide plays its home games at Rhoads Stadium. The 2011 made the postseason for the 13th straight year, and the Women's College World Series for seventh time after failing to make it in 2010. This season represents the 15th season of softball in the school's history. The Crimson Tide won the SEC Regular Season by defeating the Ole Miss Rebels 10-1.

Season

While the Tide loses two-time SEC Player of the Year Charlotte Morgan along with 2010 senior leaders Alex Blewitt and Jessica Smith, Alabama returns nine starters from a team that won the Southeastern Conference regular season and tournament championships en route to claiming the number one overall seed in the NCAA Division I tournament. The Crimson Tide softball team only has two seniors this season, Kelsi Dunne and Whitney Larsen. In the annual Southeastern Conference coaches preseason poll, the Crimson Tide was picked to win the 2011 SEC Softball title. The Crimson Tide also landed three players on the Preseason All-SEC team; Kelsi Dunne, Whitney Larsen, and Kayla Braud.

Roster

2011 Alabama Crimson Tide Softball Roster

Schedule 

|-
!colspan=9| Hibbett/Easton All-Alabama Softball Classic

 

|-
!colspan=9| Bama Bash

|-
!colspan=9|

|-
!colspan=9|USF Fairfield Inn and Suites Tampa North Tournament

|-
!colspan=9|Citrus Classic

|-
!colspan=9|

|-
!colspan=9|Easton SEC/ACC Challenge

|-
!colspan=9|

|-
!colspan=9| SEC Tournament

|-
!colspan=9| NCAA Tuscaloosa Regional

|-
!colspan=9| NCAA Tuscaloosa Super Regional

|-
!colspan=9| Women's College World Series

 †   In light of the tornado that caused massive damage in the Tuscaloosa area on April 27, the Alabama softball team's weekend series with Kentucky, scheduled to be played at Rhoads Stadium on April 29-May 1 was canceled and not be made up.

Scoring by inning

Ranking movement

Awards and honors
 Kelsi Dunne
SEC Pitcher of the Year 
Finalists for USA Softball Collegiate Player of the Year
First Team All-SEC
SEC All-Defensive team
 Whitney Larsen
First Team All-SEC
SEC All-Defensive team
SEC All-Tournament Team
 Kayla Braud
Finalists for USA Softball Collegiate Player of the Year
First Team All-SEC
Capital One Academic All-America
 Amanda Locke 
Second Team All-SEC
 Kaila Hunt
Freshman All-SEC team
 Kendall Dawson
SEC All-Defensive team
 Jazlyn Lunceford
SEC All-Defensive team 
 Jennifer Fenton
SEC All-Tournament Team

See also
 2011 Alabama Crimson Tide baseball team

References

2011 Southeastern Conference softball season
Alabama Crimson Tide softball seasons
Alabama Crimson Tide softball season
Alabama
Women's College World Series seasons